The Other One is a British sitcom, produced by BBC Television. It ran from 1977 to 1979, a total of 13 episodes were produced over two series and was written by Bob Larbey and John Esmonde. The series was a follow up vehicle for Richard Briers who recently had success in the sitcom The Good Life (1975–1978). The premise for the series initially focussed on two passengers Ralph Tanner (Briers) and Brian Bryant (Michael Gambon) who meet at Gatwick Airport, en-route on holiday to Spain. They soon find themselves on the same flight and eventually the same hotel. Although they come from different walks of life, they soon bond and form a close friendship, as they embark on a series of misadventures.

Premise 
The idea for the show came from creating a dynamic similar to The Odd Couple, where two 'misfits' with different personalities, whom are diametrically opposite in character, are drawn together in friendship. Brian is an introverted bore whom is gullible and timid, whilst Ralph is an extroverted, outgoing, lively party animal, who also happens to be a compulsive liar. When interviewed about the series in an article by Mary Malcom at the time of show's release, Larbey notes that Brian has led a boring existence and he sees Ralph as the fuse which makes his life more exciting, whilst Ralph sees Brian as someone who is naive and trustful enough not see through him. However it turns out that Ralph is rather incompetent and quite ill-equipped with everyday life, yet he always seems to impress Brian who fails to see Ralph's failings. The first series see the pair experiencing a series of misadventures during their holiday in Spain, whilst the second series charts their return to England, where they go into business together as travelling salesmen.

Cast 
 Richard Briers – Ralph Tanner
 Michael Gambon – Brian Bryant
 Hilary Mason – Mrs. Flensing
 Jill Kerman – Sue Bainbridge (Series 1)
 Michael Chesden – Manolo (Series 1)
 Martin Read – Fred (Series 1)
 Gretchen Franklin – Mrs. Tanner (Series 2)

Episodes

Series 1 (1977)

Series 2 (1979)

Reception 
The reception of the series was quite mixed, Jennifer Lovelace from the Stage described the humour in the first episode as desultory and lacking in laughs, whilst Patrick Campbell from the same publication thought that Briers look lost in his role and was prone to caricature, whilst Gambon seemed to have been created for one episode then left to his own devices. Indeed, Bill Harris writing for the Aberdeen Evening Express, described the interchange between Briers and Gambon as a slick routine of interchangeable comic and straight man roles that may not appeal to some. Although the first series was met with indifference, Bill Cotton, controller of BBC1 at the time, decided to give it another chance and commissioned another series consisting of six episodes, however a third series was not commisoned and the series was cancelled after the final episode aired in March 1979.

Home Media 
The series has seldom been repeated on television since it first aired, apart from a few repeats on UK Gold. A complete boxset of Series 1 was released by the BBC on 27 August 2007, but due to low sales, Series 2 has not been released on DVD.

External links 
 
 The Other One at British Comedy Guide

References 

1977 television series debuts
1979 television series endings
BBC television sitcoms